Patrick Forbes  may refer to:
Patrick Forbes (bishop of Aberdeen) (1564–1635), Scottish churchman
Patrick William Forbes (1861–1918), army commander
Patrick Forbes (bishop of Caithness) (1611–1680), Scottish bishop of Caithness
P. J. Forbes (born 1967), baseball player
Patrick Forbes (minister) (1776–1847), Scottish minister